Stadion im. Ojca Władysława Augustynka (Father Władysław Augustynek Stadium) is a football stadium in Nowy Sącz. It is home to Sandecja Nowy Sącz, who currently compete in I liga. The capacity of the stadium is 2,500.

History 
Władysław Augustynek Stadium was opened on 2 May 1970, which hosted a football match between the Polish national youth team and the Hungarian national youth team, where Hungary won the match 3:2.

The stadium was originally named as XXV years of PRL, at the initiative of the then Communist leaders of the city, to celebrate 25 years of existence of the PRL. In 1998, 9 years after the Fall of Communism in Poland, the stadium was renamed in the honour of Father Władysław Augustynek, a popular local Catholic priest, who was a passionate fan of the club.

In 2017, following Sandecja's promotion to the Ekstraklasa, the club was forced to play at the Bruk-Bet Stadium throughout the 2017-18 Ekstraklasa season, since the stadium did not meet PZPN and Ekstraklasa regulations to play in the first division, since the stadium must hold at least 4,666 people, and there were safety concerns regarding the stadium.

In 2018, Sandecja returned to Władysław Augustynek Stadium following their relegation from Ekstraklasa. The club was forced to spend 720,000 zł (approx. £150,000) to refurbish the stadium to comply with I liga regulations, which included installing new seats.

Expansion Plans 
In 2017, the club announced that the stadium would be fully renovated in order to comply with Ekstraklasa regulations. The stadium would include 4 brand new stands, each with a roof, and the stadium's capacity would increase to 8,000. However, these plans were never realised, and throughout the 2017-18 Ekstraklasa season, while Sandecja was playing in Nieciecza, no works have been done at the stadium. The club's hierarchy has been met with heavy criticism from Sandecja fans and from former Polish football player and current PZPN chairman Zbigniew Boniek for their failure to renovate the stadium.

In 2018, the Mayor of Nowy Sącz, Ryszard Nowak, presented the design of the new stadium, which has been approved by PZPN. The new stadium will hold 8,200 people, and will meet UEFA category III regulations. The stadium will cost 85mil zł (approx. £20mil), and the date of the renovation is yet to be confirmed.

References 

Sports venues completed in 1970
Buildings and structures in Nowy Sącz
Sandecja Nowy Sącz
Sports venues in Lesser Poland Voivodeship
Nowy Sącz
1970 establishments in Poland